Graysville is an unincorporated community in Gray Township in Greene County, Pennsylvania, United States. Graysville has a post office with ZIP code 15337.

References

Unincorporated communities in Greene County, Pennsylvania
Unincorporated communities in Pennsylvania